Choilodon is an extinct genus of ruminants possibly in the family Tragulidae (chevrotains). The type species, C. elegans, was found in phosphorites in Quercy, France.

References 

 Bouvier, E.S., 1888: Nouveaux Mammiferes Fossiles de Sansan et du Quercy. Le Nat: 149 & 150, 168 & 169

External links 

 Index Generum Mammalium: a List of the Genera and Families of Mammals Page: 186 at University of North Texas

Prehistoric even-toed ungulate genera
Fossil taxa described in 1888
Fossils of France